Pedro Cachín and Íñigo Cervantes were the defending champions but chose not to defend their title.

Gerard Granollers and Pedro Martínez won the title after defeating Daniel Gimeno Traver and Ricardo Ojeda Lara 6–0, 6–2 in the final.

Seeds

Draw

References
 Main Draw

Copa Sevilla - Doubles
2018 Doubles